Gdańsk Brzeźno is a former SKM stop in Gdańsk, Poland. It is no longer used since June 2005, after canceling passenger service on Gdańsk - Nowy Port line. This line is now used only for freight transport.

There is plan to include the stop in the planned new Metropolitan Tricity Train line to be ready for 2012 UEFA European Football Championship.

The line
The line connecting Gdańsk Główny (Danzig Hbf.) with Gdańsk Nowy Port (Danzig Neufahrwasser) was opened in October 1867. It had been electrified in 1951, but the voltage was changed (from 800 volts) into standard 3 kV in 1973. The line served mostly as the transport route for shipyard workers who commuted to the Gdańsk Shipyard. On December 15, 2002, the line was shortened to reach only Gdańsk Brzeźno. On June 25, 2005, the line was completely closed for passenger service.

References 

 Gdańsk Brzeźno at Polish Railway Database , URL accessed at April 28, 2007.

External links

Gdańsk Brzeźno at Google Local
Gdańsk Brzeźno at Railway Map of Poland.

Railway stations served by Szybka Kolej Miejska (Tricity)
Brzezno
Railway stations in Poland opened in 1867